Mississippi Highway 336 (MS 336) is a  west–east state highway in the North Central Hills region of northern Mississippi, connecting Lafayette Springs, through Thaxton, to Pontotoc. It is generally a narrow two-lane route.

Route description
Within Lafayette County, it is county-maintained as County Route 272 (CR 272). It heads east to leave Lafayette Springs and travel through some woodlands, crossing into Pontotoc County where state maintenance begins. The highway has an intersection with Hurricane Road (a county maintained eastern extension of MS 346) before winding its way through hilly woodlands for the next several miles to pass through the town of Thaxton. MS 336 then has an extremely short  concurrency with US 278/MS 6 before entering Pontotoc along Turnpike Road. The highway travels through a neighborhood before passing through a major business district, where it has an intersection with MS 15, before coming to an end shortly thereafter at an intersection MS 9/MS 338 (West Oxford Street) on the north side of downtown.

The entire length of Mississippi Highway 336 is a two-lane state highway.

Major intersections

References

External links

336
Transportation in Lafayette County, Mississippi
Transportation in Pontotoc County, Mississippi